Condaminea elegans is a flowering plant species in the genus Condaminea found in Peru.

References

External links
 Condaminea elegans at apps.kew.org

Dialypetalantheae
Plants described in 1999
Flora of Peru